Finali is an Italian-origin surname. Notable people with the surname include:

 Gaspare Finali (1829–1914), Italian politician
 Giovanni Angelo Finali (1709–1772), Italian sculptor

Italian-language surnames